The Organization of Modern Extreme Grappling Arts, also known as OMEGA or OMEGA Championship Wrestling (stylized as ΩMΞGΔ CHΔMPIΩNSHIP WRΞSTLIΠG), is an independent professional wrestling promotion based in central North Carolina.

It featured and helped launch the careers of both Hardys, Shannon Moore, Joey Matthews, Christian York, Joey Abs, C. W. Anderson, Shane Helms, and others.

History
Established in 1997, OMEGA was run and created by Matt and Jeff Hardy. They began the promotion because at the time, there were not many places to wrestle, nor did they know anyone who could help. Both Matt and Jeff Hardy took apart the ring and put it back together at every event they had, while Matt Hardy sewed all the costumes worn in OMEGA.

Closure
The promotion folded in October 1999, after both Matt and Jeff Hardy had signed with the World Wrestling Federation, leaving the other wrestlers to make careers for themselves, with many moving onto NWA Wildside.

In 2007, Highspots.com produced a two-disc DVD set entitled OMEGA: Uncommon Passion, chronicling the history of the promotion, including matches and interviews with many OMEGA wrestlers.

Revival
Matt Hardy had announced that OMEGA would return in January 2013 with an event titled "Chinlock For Chuck". The main event featured Matt Hardy, Jeff Hardy, Shane "Hurricane" Helms and "Cowboy" James Storm defeating Gunner, Steve Corino, CW Anderson and Lodi. On October 12, 2013 at "Chapel Thrill", Hardy announced a Tournament for the OMEGA Heavyweight Championship which featured Matt Hardy vs. CW Anderson and Shane "Hurricane" Helms vs. "The King" Shane Williams. After Hardy's qualifying match he was attacked by CW but was saved by the returning Willow the Whisp. Hardy won that match and now advance to the finals. In their April event "Chaos in Cameron" The Hardy Boyz defeated The Briscoe Brothers in the main event.

On February 28, 2015, OMEGA held an event called Night of a Champion, featuring the finals of the OMEGA Heavyweight Championship tournament. Jeff Hardy (replacing an injured Shane Helms) defeated his brother, Matt Hardy, to become the first OMEGA Champion since 2000.

On August 14, 2015, OMEGA announced a partnership with Global Force Wrestling (GFW). On January 25, 2017, OMEGA announced it would crown its first tag team champions since 1999.

Championships

Active championships

Defunct championships

Roster

Male wrestlers

Andrew Everett
Caleb Konley
Jeff Hardy
John Skyler
Matt Hardy
Matt Sydal
Matt Riviera
Ricky Morton
Robert Gibson
Scott Steiner
Shane Helms
Trevor Lee

Female wrestlers

Amber O'Neal
Reby Sky
Mia Svensson
Kacee Carlisle
Jayme Jameson

Notable alumni

 Cham Pain
 Rambunctious
 Christian York
 Joey Matthews
 Kid Dynamo
 Krazy K
 Lita
 Mike Maverick
 Otto Schwanz
 Rick Michaels
 Venom
 Caprice Coleman

References

External links
OMEGA Championship Wrestling Facebook
OMEGA Championship Wrestling Twitter

Further reading
Dumas, Amy and Michael Krugman. Lita: A Less Traveled R.O.A.D.--The Reality of Amy Dumas. New York: Simon & Schuster, 2003. 
Hardy, Matt and Jeff. The Hardy Boyz: Exist 2 Inspire. New York: HarperCollins Publishers, 2003. 
Keith, Scott. Wrestling's One Ring Circus: The Death of the World Wrestling Federation. New York: Citadel Press, 2004. 

Independent professional wrestling promotions based in North Carolina
Organizations established in 1997